Radio Bhumi 92.8 FM is a Dhaka-based private radio station in Bangladesh. It is well known for its sports coverage,"Radio Bhumi 92.8 FM", this name has achieved such bunches of successful milestones. They believe in the every step of our work that quality brings perfection and Radio Bhumi is a sign of a perfect outline of work. In the 21st Century, FM technology has become an elegant and stunning version of Bangladesh Radio Industry. This revolutionary addition has revived love for radio. In its continuation, Radio Bhumi 92.8 FM has pledged to hold the past tradition."Bishwashey Bangladesh" is the tagline of Radio Bhumi 92.8 FM.
And undoubtedly this firm is determined to go ahead with this slogan. Radio Bhumi 92.8 FM is the first private FM radio station in the country who broadcast Bengali song only. 
Radio Bhumi is an independent media (Radio Broadcasting and Production House) providing special services in the specific field.   
The organization has developed a unique production house with modern audio equipment with latest facilities. In the last few years, this organization has produced various social and commercial works including educational, entertainment, documentaries, motivational, sports commentary etc.
. It is a subsidiary of the Impress Group, and a sister concern to the Channel i television network. The station began transmission on 30 September 2012.

References

External links
  
Radio Bhumi 92.8FM - FM Radio Bangla
Radio Bhumi - Radio Online Live
Radio Bhumi - ALL Live Radio

Radio stations in Bangladesh